Könyves Kálmán Primary School is an educational institution in Miskolc, Hungary.

The first academic year began in 1963. The school previously held younger students and included kindergarten classes, but then later shifted towards solely admitting older students. Since its inception, the number of students in each academic year has remained roughly the same (600-700). 

In 1992, the name of Könyves Kálmán was given to the primary school, and twelve years later the Könyves Kálmán Primary School was merged with the Kaffka Margit Primary School .

References

Educational institutions established in 1963
Schools in Hungary
1963 establishments in Hungary